The following is a list of Manipur notable art forms

Martial arts 

 Huyen langlon aka Thang Ta

 Arambai hunba (Arrow throwing art)

Dance forms

Classical dance form
 Manipuri dance

Folk dance forms

 Lai Haraoba
Khamba Thoibi

Folk music

 
 Lai Haraoba Eshei
 Pena Eshei
Manipuri Sankirtan

Musical instruments

There are various traditional musical instruments of Manipur. One such instrument is-
 Pena

See also 

Art and Culture of Manipur
Tourism in Manipur
Tourist Attractions in Manipur

References

Sources
 https://manipur.gov.in/?page_id=3668
 https://www.indianmirror.com/dance/manipuri.html
 http://www.north-east-india.com/manipur/dance-music.html

Arts of Manipur